Khawla Matar is a Bahraini journalist. She is the first Bahraini woman to edit a daily newspaper, Al-Waqt, and has been the director of the United Nations Information Centre (UNIC) in Cairo. Among other outlets, she has worked for the Associated Press, BBC News, and Asharq Al-Awsat.

Education
Matar earned her high school diploma at the Khawla Secondary Girls School in 1974. She obtained her Bachelor of Arts in Media and Journalism at the University of Arkansas in 1981. At Durham University in Britain, she earned a Master of Arts in Media Sociology in 1987 and a Ph.D. in the same discipline in 1992.

Career
 1981-83: Editor/Correspondent, Al Khaleej, United Arab Emirates
 1983-84: Editor/Correspondent, Editorial Page, Akhbar Al Khaleej, Bahrain
 1984-87: Correspondent/Director of Photography, Gulf Regional Office, Associated Press
 1987-89: Editor-in-Chief, Gulf Today Panorama Magazine, Bahrain
 1989-91: Foreign Correspondent, Yemen/Djibouti/Lebanon/Bosnia and Herzegovina etc., LBC News
 1991-93: Correspondent/Political Affairs Edictor, MBC
 1993-95: Media Officer, Arab Council for Childhood and Development
 1996-2005: Media Officer, Arab States Regional Office, International Labour Organization
 2005-06: Editor-in-Chief, Al-Waqt
 2006-09: Regional Expert on Declaration on Fundamental Principles and Rights at Work, International Labour Organization
 2009–Present: Director, UNIC Cairo; in 2011, she helped draft a report on human rights in Tunisia for a high-ranking committee of the United Nations Human Rights Council
 2012: Spokesperson, Special Envoy of the Secretary-General to Syria Lakhdar Brahimi

References

Bahraini journalists
Bahraini women journalists
Alumni of Durham University
Year of birth missing (living people)
Living people